Tetralobus is a genus of click beetle belonging to the family Elateridae.

Species 
 Tetralobus arbonnieri Girard, 2003 
 Tetralobus cavifrons Fairmaire, 1887 
 Tetralobus flabellicornis (Linnaeus, 1767) - Giant Acacia Click Beetle 
 Tetralobus gigas (Fabricius, 1801) 
 Tetralobus natalensis Candèze, 1857 
 Tetralobus rotundifrons Guérin-Méneville 
 Tetralobus scutellaris Schwarz 
 Tetralobus shuckhardi (Hope, 1842

References 

 Biolib

Elateridae genera